Gloeothece is a genus of cyanobacteria belonging to the family Aphanothecaceae.

The genus was first described by Carl Nägeli in 1849.

The genus has cosmopolitan distribution.

Species:
 Gloeothece confluens Nägeli
 Gloeothece palea (Kützing) Nägeli
 Gloeothece rupestris (Lyngbye) Bornet

References

Chroococcales
Cyanobacteria genera